Basketball competitions at the 2022 South American Games in Asuncion, Paraguay were held between October 2 and 15, 2022 at the SND Arena and the Polideportivo Urbano.

Schedule
The competition schedule is as follows:

Medal summary

Medal table

Medalists

Participation
Eleven nations participated in basketball events of the 2022 South American Games.

References

Basketball
South American Games
2022
2022 South American Games